Kronos Quartet Plays Sigur Rós is a studio album by the Kronos Quartet, containing two "audience favorites," "Flugufrelsarinn" (by Sigur Rós) and "The Star-Spangled Banner" (trad., arr. S. Prutsman after Jimi Hendrix). The album is available only as a digital download.

Track listing

Musicians
David Harrington – violin
John Sherba – violin
Hank Dutt – viola
Jeffrey Zeigler – cello

See also
List of 2007 albums

References 

Kronos Quartet albums
2007 EPs
Nonesuch Records EPs
Sigur Rós